HMS Norham Castle, initially named Totnes Castle, was a  constructed for the British Royal Navy during the Second World War. Before completion, the ship was transferred to the Royal Canadian Navy, renamed HMCS Humberstone, and served the rest of the war as a convoy escort. Following the war, the corvette was sold for mercantile service, beginning as Taiwei in 1946 and ending as South Ocean in 1954. The ship was broken up in 1959.

Design and description
The Castle class were an improved corvette design over their predecessor . The Flower class was not considered acceptable for mid-Atlantic sailing and was only used on Atlantic convoy duty out of need. Though the Admiralty would have preferred s, the inability of many small shipyards to construct the larger ships required them to come up with a smaller vessel. The increased length of the Castle class over their predecessors and their improved hull form gave the Castles better speed and performance on patrol in the North Atlantic and an acceptable replacement for the Flowers. This, coupled with improved anti-submarine armament in the form of the Squid mortar led to a much more capable anti-submarine warfare (ASW) vessel. However, the design did have criticisms, mainly in the way it handled at low speeds and that the class's maximum speed was already slower than the speeds of the new U-boats they would be facing.

The ships had a complement of 120.

The ships were powered by two Admiralty three-drum boilers which created .

The corvettes were armed with one QF 4-inch Mk XIX gun mounted forward. Anti-air armament varied from 4 to 10 Oerlikon 20 mm cannons. For ASW purposes, the ships were equipped with one three-barreled Squid anti-submarine mortar with 81 projectiles. The ships also had two depth charge throwers and one depth charge rail on the stern that came with 15 depth charges.

The ships were equipped with Type 145 and Type 147B ASDIC. The Type 147B was tied to the Squid anti-submarine mortar and would automatically set the depth on the fuses of the projectiles until the moment of firing. A single Squid-launched attack had a success rate of 25%. The class was also provided with HF/DF and Type 277 radar.

Construction and career
Norham Castle, named after the castle in Northumberland, was ordered on 19 December 1942. The ship was laid down on 30 August 1943 by A. & J. Inglish Ltd. at Glasgow and launched on 12 April 1944. At some point in 1943, the vessel was transferred to the Royal Canadian Navy. Renamed Humberstone after a community in southern Ontario, the corvette was commissioned on 6 September 1944 with the pennant number K497.

After commissioning Humberstone was sent to Tobermory to work up. Following that, the ship joined the Mid-Ocean Escort Force as a member of the escort group C-8 for convoy escort duty in the Atlantic Ocean. Humberstone remained as a convoy escort for the remainder of the war. In May 1945, the ship returned to Canada, travelling to Esquimalt, British Columbia in June. The ship was paid off on 17 November 1945.

In 1946, the ship was sold for mercantile service and was converted to a cargo ship with a gross register tonnage of 1,304 tons. Renamed Taiwei and operating under Chinese ownership while registered at Shanghai in 1946, the ship was sold in 1947 to Foo Ming SS Co Ltd and renamed Chang Chen. In 1949, the cargo ship was renamed twice, first Tai Shan, then King Kang. In 1950 King Kang was sold to Wallem & Co Ltd and registered in Panama. The ship was renamed Flying Dragon in 1950 and San Blas in 1951. She became South Ocean in 1954, owned by Korea Deep Sea Fishery Co Ltd and operating under a Korean flag. The ship was broken up at Hong Kong in September 1959 by Hong Kong Chiap Hua Manufactory Co Ltd.

References

Notes

Citations

References
 
 
 
 
 

 

Ships of the Royal Canadian Navy
Castle-class corvettes
1943 ships